Gloria Ortiz-Hernandez (born 1943) is a Colombian artist and sculptor known for her drawing and painting.

Collections
 Seattle Art Museum
 Museum of Modern Art, New York
 Essex Collection of Art from Latin America
 Harvard Art Museums
 Morgan Library & Museum, New York
Museum of Fine Arts Houston

References

1943 births
Living people
20th-century Colombian women artists
21st-century Colombian women artists